Robert Eitner (22October 18322February 1905) was a German musicologist, researcher and bibliographer.

Life
Robert Eitner was born and grew up in Breslau, the rapidly industrialising administrative capital of Silesia.   He attended the St. Elisabeth Gymnasium (secondary school) in the city before moving on to study at the university where for five years he was taught by the organist-composer Moritz Brosig.   Sources nevertheless stress that in many respects Eitner was self-taught.

In 1853 he moved to Berlin, becoming a music teacher. A succession of piano compositions and songs followed. In 1863 he opened his own music school, but by now he was increasingly diverting his attention away from teaching and towards music research and writing. In 1867 he produced a "Lexicon of Dutch Composers" which won a prize from the Amsterdam "Society for the promotion of Music", although in the end it was never published.

In 1868 Eitner headed up the establishment in Berlin of the "Society of Music Research" (Gesellschaft für Musikforschung), becoming secretary to the association and editor of its monthly magazine, Monatshefte für Musik-Geschichte, launched in 1869.   Another series of publications from the association was the 29-volume set entitled Publikation älterer praktischer und theoretischer Musikwerke, although it appears that this was never published in its entirety.   There was also a succession of bibliographical works, which reflected Eitner's own enthusiasm for compositions from the sixteenth and seventeenth centuries.   In addition, there was a ten-volume reference compendium entitled Biographisch-Bibliographisches Quellen-Lexikon der Musiker und Musikgelehrten der christlichen Zeitrechnung bis zur Mitte des neunzehnten Jahrhunderts, published between 1900 and 1904 in Leipzig, which set out the locations of both printed and manuscript works by early composers and musicologists, and which in the end was sufficiently valued as a research tool to be available in more than 200 major libraries in Europe.

Another of Eitner's literary contributions involved the 399 biographical articles he contributed to the Allgemeine Deutsche Biographie, almost all of which were concerned with musicians.

In 1882 he relocated to Templin, a country town located between Berlin and the country's East Sea (i.e. Baltic Sea) coast.    It was here that he died in 1905.

Notes

References

Writers from Wrocław
People from the Province of Silesia
Musicologists from Berlin
1832 births
1905 deaths
19th-century German musicologists